Alex Campbell and his Friends is an album by Alex Campbell with: Sandy Denny, Johnny Silvo and the Johnny Silvo Folk Group featuring Roger Evans and David Moses, Paul McNeill and Cliff Aungier.

This March 1967 recording is the first release that Sandy Denny is featured on.

Tracks
Side 1
Alex Campbell: "Dark as a Dungeon (Down in the Mine)" (Merle Travis)
Johnny Silvo: "Midnight Special" (trad)
Johnny Silvo: "Cornbread, Peas and Black Molasses" (trad)
Johnny Silvo: "Freight Train" (Elizabeth Cotten)
Sandy Denny: "The False Bride" (trad)
Alex Campbell: "Don't Think Twice It's Alright" (Bob Dylan)
Cliff Aungier: "Chilly Winds" (trad)
Cliff Aungier: "Blue Sleeves" (trad)

Side 2
Paul McNeill: "Dick Derby" (trad)
Sandy Denny: "You Never Wanted Me" (Jackson C. Frank)
Alex Campbell: "Been on the Road So Long" (Alex Campbell)
Cliff Aungier: "Dink's Song" (trad)
Sandy Denny (with the Johnny Silvo Folk Group): "This Train" (trad)
Paul McNeill: "Tell Old Bill" (trad)
Alex Campbell: "Freedom" (trad)
"

Reissues
Saga Records produced another album with Sandy Denny: Sandy and Johnny. In 1970 Saga released a compilation called It's Sandy Denny that featured the songs Denny recorded for the label, partly as alternate takes.

The complete material (original plus alternate takes) was issued by Castle Music in 2005 under the title Where the Time Goes.

External links
Album Track Listing Retrieved 28 March 2013.

1967 debut albums
Sandy Denny albums
Collaborative albums
Alex Campbell (singer) albums